Gary Hirshberg (born 1954) is an American businessman. He is the former chief executive officer of Stonyfield Farm, the world's leading organic yogurt producer, based in Londonderry, New Hampshire. He joined the company just after its founding in 1983 and stepped down in 2011, but continues to serve as Chairman. He frequently speaks on topics including sustainability, organic agriculture and the profitability of green business.

In 2011, Hirshberg was mentioned as a possible Democratic candidate for the U.S. Senate against New Hampshire's junior U.S. Senator John E. Sununu.

Early life and education
Hirshberg was born in Manchester, New Hampshire in 1954. Hirshberg was one of the first graduates of Hampshire College in Amherst, Massachusetts in 1976. He was also one of the first graduates of The Derryfield School in Manchester, New Hampshire.

Work history
In his early career, Hirshberg served as the Executive Director of The New Alchemy Institute, a research and education center dedicated to organic farming, aquaculture and renewable energy. He also held positions ranging from water pumping windmill specialist, to environmental educator with the U.S. Fish and Wildlife Service.

In 1983, Hirshberg joined the Board of The Rural Education Center (TREC), a small, seven-cow organic farming school in Wilton, NH from which Stonyfield was born. Hirshberg led Stonyfield from its infancy to $360 million in annual sales when he stepped down as CE-Yo at the end of 2011.

Under Hirshberg's reign, Stonyfield launched many innovative marketing programs aimed not only at growing customer loyalty to the brand but also in building public interest in sustainability, the environment, and small family farming. In 1989, the Adopt-a-Cow Program (which was later renamed to the Have-a-Cow Educational Program), allowed frequent customers to "adopt" their own cow, learning about the value of small family farms in the process. Participants would receive a photo of their sponsored Stonyfield cow, updates about life on the farm and issues small farmers faced, as well as information about sustainable farming methods. Although originally envisioned as a one-cow-one-parent model, each cow ended up with multiple sponsors just weeks after the program launched due to its instant popularity. Other Stonyfield programs include Profits for the Planet, by which Stonyfield donated 10% of their profits annually through grants to various environmentally focused non-profit organizations and Salute Your Commute, a program designed encouraged consumers to use alternative modes of transportation to help reduce carbon emissions.

During Hirshberg's tenure, Stonyfield enjoyed a compounded annual growth rate of over 23% by consistently producing superior products and using innovative marketing that blended the company's social, environmental, and financial missions. Hirshberg arranged the sale of Stonyfield to Danone in 2001, and stayed on as CEO for an additional 10 years, naming former Ben & Jerry's CEO Walt Freese as his successor in January 2012. At that time, Hirshberg moved into the role of Chairman and also became the Managing Director of Stonyfield Europe, launching organic brands in France, Ireland, Italy and Spain.  He resigned from his Danone responsibilities in March 2017 when Danone was required by the US Dept of Justice to divest its Stonyfield holdings. Hirshberg remains Stonyfield's Chair under the new ownership, Lactalis.

Activities 
Hirshberg serves on several corporate and non-profit boards including Blue Apron, Inc. (NYSE- APRN), Forager Project (organic plant-based dairy alternatives), Late July Snacks (organic salty snacks), Orgain (organic protein drinks and powders), Peak Organic Brewing, sweetgreen (national organic and natural fast casual restaurant chain), Sweet Earth Natural Foods (organic and natural vegan and vegetarian entrees), and Unreal (producer of organic and non-gmo candy), as well as on the Advisory Board of Applegate (organic meats). He was also the chairman and co-founder of O'Naturals, a chain of fast food restaurants.

Outside the corporate world, Hirshberg is Chairman and a founding Partner of Just Label It, the national campaign to label genetically engineered foods. He is also the Chairman of Organic Voices, a consortium that seeks to eliminate consumer confusion about the benefits of organic. In March, 2011, President Obama appointed Hirshberg to serve on the Advisory Committee for Trade Policy and Negotiations, where he served from 2011 until February 2017.

Publications
Hirshberg is the author of the 2008 book, Stirring it Up: How to Make Money and Save the World, a book about socially-minded business that calls on individuals to realize their power to make a difference in the marketplace, while doing business in ways that adhere to a multiple bottom line - one that takes into consideration not only finance, but the environment and health as well.

Label it Now: What You Need to Know About Genetically Engineered Foods, co-author, eBook, New Word City, Inc. 2012
Anything But Neutral About Going (Carbon) Neutral, eBook, New Word City, Inc. 2011
Stirring it Up: How to Make Money and Save the World. Hyperion, 2008
Gardening for all seasons: The complete guide to producing food at home 12 months a year, co-author, Brick House Pub Co., 1983
The New Alchemy Water Pumping Windmill Book, Brick House Pub Co., 1982

Personal life
Hirshberg is the husband of writer Meg Cadoux Hirshberg and a father of three adult children, all of whom work in organic and sustainability ventures. He currently lives in Concord, New Hampshire.

Awards and recognition 
A New Hampshire native, Hirshberg has received twelve honorary doctorates and won numerous awards for corporate and environmental leadership including a 2012 Lifetime Achievement Award by the US EPA. He was named a Yale Gordon Grand Fellow, one of "America's Most Promising Social Entrepreneurs" by Business Week and one of the top ten, "most inspiring people in sustainable food." by Fast Company.  He was featured in the successful 2008 documentary "Food, Inc."

Throughout his career, Hirshberg has received the following representative awards:

 Mount Sinai Children's Environmental Health Center Champion for Children award, 2015
 Center for Social Innovation and Enterprise, Social Innovator of the Year, 2015
 US Environmental Protection Agency Lifetime Achievement Award, 2012
 Organic Trade Association Organic Leadership Award, 2012
 New Hope Natural Media Hall of Legends Inductee, 2012
 Yale University Gordon Grand Fellow, 2010
 Global Green Foundation Millennial Award for Corporate Environmental Responsibility, 1999
 Business NH Magazine Business Leader of the Year, 1998
 US Small Business Administration Small Business Leader of the Year, 1998
 Ernst and Young New England Socially Responsible Entrepreneur of the Year Award, 1993

References

External links
 Stonyfield Farm Company Bio
 Hitched to Someone Else's Dream, an Inc. Magazine article on Stonyfield's early days by Meg Hirshberg
 Video of discussion with Gary Hirshberg on the organic food industry in Asia at the Asia Society, New York, 11/9/2009
 How I Built This Podcast - Stonyfield Yogurt: Gary Hirshberg

Hampshire College alumni
Living people
People from Concord, New Hampshire
People from Manchester, New Hampshire
New Hampshire Democrats
American chief executives of food industry companies
1954 births